The Canning Basin is a geological basin located in Western Australia. Deposition of sediments began after early-Ordovician thermal subsidence, and continued into the Early Cretaceous.

The Basin covers approximately 506,000 km2 of which approximately 430,000 km2 is on land.

It has been recognised as having prospective oil and gas capacity and has been studied extensively;  250 wells have been drilled and 78,000 km of seismic shot.

The basin is also a distinct physiographic province of the larger West Australian Shield division.

The Canning Basin is home to a Devonian fossil reef complex that stretches 350 km across the northern edge of the basin. The fossil reef is very well preserved and is cut by several modern canyons, including Geikie Gorge and Windjana Gorge.
The fossil sites associated the ancient reef system that extended for around one thousand kilometres along what is now the northwest of the Australian continent, described as resembling the modern Great Barrier Reef off the coast of Eastern Australia. The sites have produced ancient fossil material in an excellent state of preservation, most notably those revealing details of the structure of skeletons and soft-tissues of early amphibians. One important site is referred to as the "Devonian 'Great Barrier Reef'", and another, the "Gogo fish fossil site" (the Gogo formation), is named for the discovery of the Gogo fish.

The internal features of the basin include:
 sub basins - the Fitzroy Trough-Gregory Sub-basin complex, the  Willara Sub-basin,  and the Kidson Sub-basin complex
 shelves - Anketell shelf, Billiluna shelf, Tabletop shelf, Lennard shelf, Ryan Shelf
 terraces - Balgo terrace

The Australian Bureau of Mineral Resources report of the geology of the basin outlines the early exploration:

The Bureau started field work in the Canning Basin in 1947 and continued every year up to 1958. This work was carried out by geological parties equipped with land vehicles (1947-56) and with a helicopter (1957), by seismic and gravity parties, by an airborne magnetic party, and by a stratigraphical drilling party (1955-58). All work was based on air photographs, at a scale of 1:50,000, prepared by the R.A.A.F. This bulletin incorporates the results of all these surveys. The first attempt at compiling a geology of the Canning Basin was made by Reeves in 1949

References

Further reading
 Raine, M. J. (1972) Bibliography of the Canning Basin, Western Australia. Canberra : Australian Government Publishing Service. Bureau of Mineral Resources, Geology and Geophysics. Reports; no. 155.

External links
Canning Basin Geology

Geology of Western Australia
Physiographic provinces
Sedimentary basins of Australia
Kimberley (Western Australia)